Arthur Hopley  (17 October 1906 – 25 September 1981) was a senior Anglican priest in the second half of the twentieth century.

Hopley was educated at the Sir George Monoux Grammar and  Wells Theological College.  His first post was a curacy at St Mark, Bath. He was Rector of Claverton from 1944 to 1950; Vicar of Chard from 1950 to 1962; ; Archdeacon of Bath from 1962 to 1971; and Archdeacon of Taunton from 1971 to 1977.

Notes

1906 births
Alumni of Wells Theological College
People educated at Sir George Monoux College
Archdeacons of Bath
Archdeacons of Taunton
1981 deaths